Fain is a French surname, and it derived from the Latin Fanum meaning 'temple'. Notable people with the surname include:

Agathon Jean François Fain (1778–1837), French historian
Ben Fain, American bridge player
Benjamin Fain (1930–2013), Israeli physicist
Ferris Fain (1921–2001), American baseball player
Harry Fain (1918–2007), American lawyer
Holley Fain (born 1981), American actress
Joe Fain, American politician
Melanie Fain (born 1958), American printmaker
Rhea Fain, NASCAR team owner
Richard Fain (born 1968), American football player
Sammy Fain (1902–1989), American composer
Tim Fain, American violinist